George Converse  may refer to:
George L. Converse (1827–1897), U.S. Representative from Ohio
George A. Converse (1844–1909), U.S. Navy, naval engineer